The following is a discography of production by Kardinal Offishall.

Production discography

References

External links
Kardinal Offishall production credits at Discogs

Discographies of Canadian artists
Hip hop discographies
Production discographies